Nina Childress (born Christine Childress, 1961) is a French-American visual artist, based in Paris, France.

Life and work
Born in Pasadena, California, United States, she studied in Paris at the Ecole National Supérieure des Arts Décoratifs (ENSAD). At the end of the 1970s, she took an active part in the French punk movement with her group, Lucrate Milk. She started painting at the same time and, from 1985 to 1989, joined the street artist collective Les Frères Ripoulin.

Her work has been shown internationally in museums, art centers and galleries. In 2012, the Museum d'art moderne et contemporain (Geneva) held a major exhibition of her paintings. In 2013, the Palais de Tokyo commissioned her Green Curtain: a large in-situ installation for the entrance of the museum.

Childress teaches painting at the École nationale supérieure des Beaux-Arts since 2019. She was teaching before at the École nationale supérieure d’art (ENSA) in Nancy, France.

Solo exhibitions selection
 Savons, Galerie Jennifer Flay, Paris, 1993
 Nina Childress, Galerie Philippe Rizzo, Paris, 1996
 Blurriness, Galerie Éric Dupont, Paris, 2001
 Mes longs cheveux…, Galerie Artra, Genoa (Italy), 2004
 Nina Childress, Galerie Bernard Jordan, Paris, 2007
 Tableaux / Bilder, Galerie Bernard Jordan, Zürich, 2009
 La haine de la peinture, Fonds régional d'art contemporain (FRAC), Limoges, 2009
 Détail et destin, MAMCO, Geneva, 2009
 Die Grüne Kammer, Galerie Heinz-Martin Weigand, Karlsruhe, 2010
 L’enterrement, Galerie Bernard Jordan, Paris, 2011
 L’effet Sissi, MAMCO, Geneva, 2012
 Umriss, Galerie Bernard Jordan, Zürich, 2012
 Der Grüne Vorhang, Heinz Martin Gallery, Berlin, 2013
 Les nudistes, Galerie Bernard Jordan, Paris, 2014
 Jazy, Hedy et Sissi, La Halle aux Bouchers, Vienne, 2014
 Magenta, Centre Régional d'Art Contemporain, Sète, 2015
 Peindre et acheter, Le Parvis, Tarbes, 2016
 Le requiem du string, Le Carré, Château Gontier, 2016
 Elle aurait dû rester au lit, Galerie Bernard Jordan, Paris, 2016
 Le hibou aussi trouve ses petits jolis, Musée Paul Dupuy pour le Printemps de Septembre, Toulouse, 2018
Lobody Noves Me, Fondation d’entreprise Ricard, Paris
Cils poils cheveux, Musée des beaux-arts de La Chaux-de-Fonds, 2022

Collective exhibitions (selection) 

 2008
 Modern young people, galerie agnès b., Paris
 2009
 Modern young people, galerie agnès b., Hong Kong
 A painting exhibition, Zoo galerie, Nantes
 2010
 Brune/blonde, Cinémathèque française, Paris
 Big Ben's Chime,  Centre d'art d'Ivry, Ivry 
 2018
 Slalom, ancien musée de Peinture, Grenoble 
 Christmas Show, collection 100%, galerie des Multiples, Paris
 Natural not natural, musée des Beaux-Arts, Ajaccio
2021
Inventory, MAMCO, Genève
Unexpected Encounters, Les Plateaux Sauvages, Fabrique artistique et culturelle, Paris
Acquisitions collections permanentes, Musée d’Art Moderne, Paris
2022
With bare hands, Mac Val, Vitry
A rose is a petunia is a mimosa, Galerie Eva Vautier, Nice

References

External links
 Nina Childress website
 Nina Childress work at Heinz Martin Gallery, Berlin
 Nina Childress work at Gallery Bernard Jordan Zurich (de)

1961 births
American contemporary artists
French contemporary artists
Living people
Women punk rock singers
French artists
French women painters
20th-century French painters
21st-century French painters
20th-century French women artists
21st-century French women artists